Angrboda (Saturn LV), provisionally known as S/2004 S 22, is a natural satellite of Saturn. Its discovery was announced by Scott S. Sheppard, David C. Jewitt, and Jan Kleyna on October 7, 2019 from observations taken between December 12, 2004 and February 1, 2006. It was given its permanent designation in August 2021. On 24 August 2022, it was officially named after Angrboða, a jötunn in Norse mythology. She is the consort of Loki and the mother of the wolf Fenrir, the Midgard serpent Jörmungandr, and the ruler of the dead Hel.

Angrboda is about 3 kilometres in diameter, and orbits Saturn at an average distance of 20.636 Gm in 1107.13 days, at an inclination of 177° to the ecliptic, in a retrograde direction and with an eccentricity of 0.251.

References

Norse group
Irregular satellites
Moons of Saturn
Discoveries by Scott S. Sheppard
Astronomical objects discovered in 2019
Moons with a retrograde orbit